Lyon Township may refer to:

Iowa 
Lyon Township, Hamilton County, Iowa
Lyon Township, Lyon County, Iowa

Kansas 
Lyon Township, Cherokee County, Kansas
Lyon Township, Cloud County, Kansas
Lyon Township, Decatur County, Kansas
Lyon Township, Dickinson County, Kansas
Lyon Township, Geary County, Kansas

Michigan 
Lyon Township, Oakland County, Michigan
Lyon Township, Roscommon County, Michigan

Missouri 
Lyon Township, Franklin County, Missouri
Lyon Township, Knox County, Missouri
Lyon Township, Lewis County, Missouri

North Dakota 
Lyon Township, Stutsman County, North Dakota, in Stutsman County, North Dakota

South Dakota 
Lyon Township, South Dakota, in Brule County, South Dakota

See also 
 Lyons Township (disambiguation)

Township name disambiguation pages